Rosie Casals and Billie Jean King successfully defended their title, defeating Margaret Court and Evonne Goolagong in the final, 6–3, 6–2 to win the ladies' doubles tennis title at the 1971 Wimbledon Championships.

Seeds

  Rosie Casals /  Billie Jean King (champions)
  Margaret Court /  Evonne Goolagong (final)
  Judy Dalton /  Virginia Wade (third round)
  Gail Chanfreau /  Françoise Dürr (semifinals)

Draw

Finals

Top half

Section 1

Section 2

Bottom half

Section 3

Section 4

References

External links

1971 Wimbledon Championships – Women's draws and results at the International Tennis Federation

Women's Doubles
Wimbledon Championship by year – Women's doubles
Wimbledon Championships
Wimbledon Championships